Tazeh Kand-e Adaghan (also Romanized as Tāzeh Kand-e Ādāghān) is a village in Chaybasar-e Jonubi Rural District, in the Central District of Maku County, West Azerbaijan Province, Iran. At the 2006 census, its population was 138, in 26 families.

References 

Populated places in Maku County